Lahoti is an Indian family name. Notable people with the surname include:

 Ramesh Chandra Lahoti, Chief Justice of India
 Puranmal Lahoti, Indian parliamentarian

See also
Puranmal Lahoti Government Polytechnic Latur

Indian surnames
Occupational surnames